Mikhail Sergeyevich Kuzmich (born 8 October 1982 in Krasnoyarsk) is a Russian luger who has competed since 1999. Competing in three Winter Olympics, he earned his best finish of 11th in the men's doubles event at Turin in 2006.

Kuzmich's best finish at the FIL World Luge Championships was eighth in the men's doubles event at Oberhof in 2008. His best finish at the FIL European Luge Championships was sixth in the men's doubles event at Sigulda in 2010.

References
 2002 luge men's doubles results
 2006 luge men's doubles results
 CBS Sportsline.com profile
 FIL-Luge profile (as Michail Kuzmich)

External links
 

1982 births
Living people
Lugers at the 2002 Winter Olympics
Lugers at the 2006 Winter Olympics
Lugers at the 2010 Winter Olympics
Olympic lugers of Russia
Sportspeople from Krasnoyarsk
Russian male lugers